Thambatty is a village which is 11 km from Ooty in Tamil Nadu, India. It is surrounded by mountains and tea estates. Tea gardens with good crops, strawberry fields and vegetable cultivated lands are present in this village. It is scenic and has hosted movie shootings.  

The heart of the village is surrounded by temples. Every year people celebrate Mari habba, which is a wonderful springtime fest in Thambatty. Loving hearts of Thambatty, who were scattered throughout India and the world for education and work, return to celebrate this festival. After worship and blessings from God, this habba continues with badaga songs, masti badaga dance, badaga play, tasty food and drinks, and socialising. Home-made foods like "Thupadittu" (made of maida and ghee), "Rava laddoo", mixture, vada, paiyasam, etc., are special for this festival.

References

Villages in Nilgiris district